Chavusy or Chausy is a town in Mogilev Region, Belarus. Chavusy serves as the administrative center of Chavusy Raion. As of 2009, its population was 10,692.

Jewish history
It once was a substantial Jewish shtetl, which dated from the 17th century, as appears from a charter granted to the Jews January 11, 1667, by Michał Kazimierz Pac, castellan of Wilno, and confirmed by King Augustus III of Poland. March 9, 1739.

In 1780, at the time of a visit of Catherine II, there was a Jewish population of 355, in  1,057; and the town possessed one synagogue. In 1803 the Jewish population was 453, in  1,185; in 1870 it was 2,433, in  4,167; and in 1897, 2,775, in  about 6,000. Some of the Jewish artisans were employed in the tanneries and in silk and woolen factories. The Jewish population in the district of Chaussy (including the town) in 1897 was 7,444, or 8.42 per cent of the total population.

Chaussy was occupied during World War II by the Germans beginning in July 1941. Though a portion of the Jewish population was able to escape before the Germans arrived, the remaining Jews were registered, marked and subjected to forced labor under the German occupation. The first two round-ups of Jews occurred in August 1941, in which approximately 50 Jews were killed. Overall, approximately 675 Jews were executed in Chaussy. In 1952-53, thanks to funds collected from the relatives of victims, the remains of the victims were reburied at the Jewish cemetery.  A total of 127 bags of remains were reburied, and the first memorial was erected in 1958, which was later replaced by a second one.

Notable residents
 Ekaterina Ivanchikova, singer
 Parents of actor Kirk Douglas

References

External links 
 Unofficial site of the city Chausy and Chaussy District
 The murder of the Jews of Chavusy during World War II, at Yad Vashem website.

Towns in Belarus
Populated places in Mogilev Region
Chavusy District
Cossack Hetmanate
Chaussky Uyezd
Shtetls
Holocaust locations in Belarus